The 1980–81 NBA season was Indiana's fifth season in the NBA and their 14th season as a franchise.

Offseason

NBA Draft

Roster

Regular season

Notes
 z, y – division champions
 x – clinched playoff spot

Record vs. opponents

Game log

Regular season

|- align="center" bgcolor="#ccffcc"
| 1
| October 10, 1980
| @ New Jersey
| W 110–91
|
|
|
| Rutgers Athletic Center
| 1–0
|- align="center" bgcolor="#ccffcc"
| 2
| October 11, 1980
| Detroit
| W 100–87
| Davis (22)
| Edwards (16)
| Davis (11)
| Market Square Arena
| 2–0
|- align="center" bgcolor="#ffcccc"
| 3
| October 15, 19807:35p.m. EST
| Chicago
| L 97–108
|
|
|
| Market Square Arena6,909
| 2–1
|- align="center" bgcolor="#ccffcc"
| 4
| October 18, 19807:35p.m. EST
| Boston
| W 103–99
| Edwards (18)
| McGinnis (11)
| Bantom (6)
| Market Square Arena11,713
| 3–1
|- align="center" bgcolor="#ccffcc"
| 5
| October 21, 1980
| @ Atlanta
| W 121–116
|
|
|
| The Omni
| 4–1
|- align="center" bgcolor="#ffcccc"
| 6
| October 22, 19807:35p.m. EST
| Milwaukee
| L 105–119
| Bantom (20)
| G. Johnson (14)
| Bantom (6)
| Market Square Arena7,138
| 4–2
|- align="center" bgcolor="#ccffcc"
| 7
| October 24, 1980
| Atlanta
| W 104–97
|
|
|
| Market Square Arena
| 5–2
|- align="center" bgcolor="#ffcccc"
| 8
| October 25, 1980
| @ Cleveland
| L 100–118
|
|
|
| Richfield Coliseum
| 5–3
|- align="center" bgcolor="#ccffcc"
| 9
| October 29, 1980
| New York
| W 102–95
|
|
|
| Market Square Arena
| 6–3
|- align="center" bgcolor="#ccffcc"
| 10
| October 31, 19808:35p.m. EST
| @ Chicago
| W 121–114
| Knight (22)
| C. Johnson (7)
| Davis (10)
| Chicago Stadium5,127
| 7–3

|- align="center" bgcolor="#ccffcc"
| 11
| November 1, 1980
| New Jersey
| W 113–100
|
|
|
| Market Square Arena
| 8–3
|- align="center" bgcolor="#ffcccc"
| 12
| November 2, 19808:30p.m. EST
| @ Milwaukee
| L 121–135
| Edwards (23)
| Knight (7)
| Bradley,Davis,Knight (5)
| MECCA Arena10,980
| 8–4
|- align="center" bgcolor="#ffcccc"
| 13
| November 4, 19809:35p.m. EST
| @ Phoenix
| L 108–109
| Bantom (18)
| Edwards,C. Johnson (9)
| Bradley (5)
| Arizona Veterans Memorial Coliseum12,018
| 8–5
|- align="center" bgcolor="#ffcccc"
| 14
| November 8, 1980
| @ Golden State
| L 111–118
|
|
|
| Oakland-Alameda County Coliseum Arena
| 8–6
|- align="center" bgcolor="#ffcccc"
| 15
| November 10, 1980
| @ Utah
| L 106–108
|
|
|
| Salt Palace Acord Arena
| 8–7
|- align="center" bgcolor="#ccffcc"
| 16
| November 11, 19808:30p.m. EST
| @ San Antonio
| W 119–113
| Knight (52)
| Edwards (6)
| Bradley (10)
| HemisFair Arena11,282
| 9–7
|- align="center" bgcolor="#ffcccc"
| 17
| November 13, 19808:00p.m. EST
| Philadelphia
| L 103–130
| Orr (20)
| G. Johnson (10)
| Bradley (6)
| Market Square Arena11,421
| 9–8
|- align="center" bgcolor="#ccffcc"
| 18
| November 14, 1980
| Washington
| W 118–108
|
|
|
| Market Square Arena
| 10–8
|- align="center" bgcolor="#ccffcc"
| 18
| November 18, 1980
| @ Detroit
| W 102–97
|
|
|
| Pontiac Silverdome
| 11–8
|- align="center" bgcolor="#ffcccc"
| 20
| November 19, 19807:35p.m. EST
| Boston
| L 91–103
| Knight (27)
| G. Johnson,Knight (11)
| Davis (7)
| Market Square Arena10,815
| 11–9
|- align="center" bgcolor="#ffcccc"
| 21
| November 21, 19808:05p.m. EST
| @ Philadelphia
| L 88–97
| G. Johnson (19)
| G. Johnson (16)
| Davis (7)
| The Spectrum8,237
| 11–10
|- align="center" bgcolor="#ccffcc"
| 22
| November 22, 19807:35p.m. EST
| Houston
| W 129–120
| Knight (22)
| C. Johnson (11)
| Davis (10)
| Market Square Arena7,357
| 12–10
|- align="center" bgcolor="#ccffcc"
| 23
| November 26, 1980
| Atlanta
| W 110–89
|
|
|
| Market Square Arena
| 13–10
|- align="center" bgcolor="#ffcccc"
| 24
| November 27, 1980
| @ Washington
| L 108–123
|
|
|
| Capital Centre
| 13–11
|- align="center" bgcolor="#ccffcc"
| 25
| November 29, 1980
| Cleveland
| W 117–101
|
|
|
| Market Square Arena
| 14–11

|- align="center" bgcolor="#ccffcc"
| 26
| December 2, 1980
| @ New York
| W 113–96
|
|
|
| Madison Square Garden
| 15–11
|- align="center" bgcolor="#ccffcc"
| 27
| December 3, 1980
| Washington
| W 128–115
|
|
|
| Market Square Arena
| 16–11
|- align="center" bgcolor="#ffcccc"
| 28
| December 5, 19809:00p.m. EST
| @ Milwaukee
| L 100–102
| Bantom (25)
| Bantom (12)
| Bantom (8)
| MECCA Arena11,052
| 16–12
|- align="center" bgcolor="#ccffcc"
| 29
| December 6, 19807:35p.m. EST
| Kansas City
| W 107–88
| Davis (20)
| Edwards (10)
| Davis (6)
| Market Square Arena7,099
| 17–12
|- align="center" bgcolor="#ccffcc"
| 30
| December 10, 19807:35p.m. EST
| Phoenix
| W 102–90
| Edwards (17)
| Edwards (10)
| Davis (7)
| Market Square Arena9,140
| 18–12
|- align="center" bgcolor="#ccffcc"
| 31
| December 11, 1980
| @ Cleveland
| W 103–100
|
|
|
| Richfield Coliseum
| 19–12
|- align="center" bgcolor="#ffcccc"
| 32
| December 13, 1980
| @ Washington
| L 105–114
|
|
|
| Capital Centre
| 19–13
|- align="center" bgcolor="#ffcccc"
| 33
| December 16, 19807:35p.m. EST
| Philadelphia
| L 107–109
| Knight (24)
| McGinnia (16)
| Davis (5)
| Market Square Arena12,539
| 19–14
|- align="center" bgcolor="#ffcccc"
| 34
| December 19, 1980
| @ Detroit
| L 106–109
|
|
|
| Pontiac Silverdome
| 19–15
|- align="center" bgcolor="#ccffcc"
| 35
| December 20, 19808:35p.m. EST
| @ Kansas City
| W 107–103
| Davis (19)
| McGinnis (15)
| McGinnis (6)
| Kemper Arena5,910
| 20–15
|- align="center" bgcolor="#ccffcc"
| 36
| December 23, 1980
| New Jersey
| W 125–109
|
|
|
| Market Square Arena
| 21–15
|- align="center" bgcolor="#ffcccc"
| 37
| December 26, 1980
| @ Los Angeles
| L 115–116
|
|
|
| The Forum
| 21–16
|- align="center" bgcolor="#ffcccc"
| 38
| December 27, 1980
| @ San Diego
| L 109–121
|
|
|
| San Diego Sports Arena
| 21–17
|- align="center" bgcolor="#ffcccc"
| 39
| December 30, 1980
| @ Denver
| L 110–127
|
|
|
| McNichols Sports Arena
| 21–18

|- align="center" bgcolor="#ccffcc"
| 40
| January 2, 1981
| @ Atlanta
| W 109–106
|
|
|
| The Omni
| 22–18
|- align="center" bgcolor="#ccffcc"
| 41
| January 3, 1981
| San Diego
| W 128–104
|
|
|
| Market Square Arena
| 23–18
|- align="center" bgcolor="#ccffcc"
| 42
| January 4, 1981
| @ New Jersey
| W 113–104
|
|
|
| Rutgers Athletic Center
| 24–18
|- align="center" bgcolor="#ccffcc"
| 43
| January 7, 1981
| New Jersey
| W 112–103
|
|
|
| Market Square Arena
| 25–18
|- align="center" bgcolor="#ccffcc"
| 44
| January 8, 1981
| @ New York
| W 117–116 (OT)
|
|
|
| Madison Square Garden
| 26–18
|- align="center" bgcolor="#ccffcc"
| 45
| January 10, 19817:35p.m. EST
| Milwaukee
| W 106–102
| Knight (21)
| McGinnis (16)
| Buse (6)
| Market Square Arena14,505
| 27–18
|- align="center" bgcolor="#ccffcc"
| 46
| January 14, 1981
| Detroit
| W 101–99
|
|
|
| Market Square Arena
| 28–18
|- align="center" bgcolor="#ffcccc"
| 47
| January 16, 1981
| Seattle
| L 94–95
|
|
|
| Market Square Arena
| 28–19
|- align="center" bgcolor="#ccffcc"
| 48
| January 18, 1981
| Utah
| W 110–89
|
|
|
| Market Square Arena
| 29–19
|- align="center" bgcolor="#ffcccc"
| 49
| January 20, 19818:35p.m. EST
| @ Chicago
| L 105–121
| Bantom (25)
| C Johnson (9)
| Edwards (7)
| Chicago Stadium5,519
| 29–20
|- align="center" bgcolor="#ffcccc"
| 50
| January 21, 19818:05p.m. EST
| @ Philadelphia
| L 104–118
| McGinnis (25)
| Edwards (8)
| Bradley,Davis,McGinnis (4)
| The Spectrum9,752
| 29–21
|- align="center" bgcolor="#ffcccc"
| 51
| January 23, 19817:30p.m. EST
| @ Boston
| L 103–104
| Edwards (19)
| McGinnis (9)
| Bantom (5)
| Boston Garden15,320
| 29–22
|- align="center" bgcolor="#ccffcc"
| 52
| January 24, 1981
| Dallas
| W 107–89
|
|
|
| Market Square Arena
| 30–22
|- align="center" bgcolor="#ffcccc"
| 53
| January 27, 1981
| @ Cleveland
| L 109–114
|
|
|
| Richfield Coliseum
| 30–23
|- align="center" bgcolor="#ccffcc"
| 54
| January 28, 1981
| Golden State
| W 108–102
|
|
|
| Market Square Arena
| 31–23

|- align="center"
|colspan="9" bgcolor="#bbcaff"|All-Star Break
|- style="background:#cfc;"
|- bgcolor="#bbffbb"
|- align="center" bgcolor="#ccffcc"
| 55
| February 3, 19818:30p.m. EST
| @ Milwaukee
| W 108–99
| Knight (24)
| Orr (11)
| Bantom,Davis (9)
| MECCA Arena11,052
| 32–23
|- align="center" bgcolor="#ffcccc"
| 56
| February 4, 1981
| Los Angeles
| L 96–102
|
|
|
| Market Square Arena
| 32–24
|- align="center" bgcolor="#ffcccc"
| 57
| February 6, 19817:30p.m. EST
| @ Boston
| L 98–111
| Bantom (24)
| Orr (7)
| McGinnis (7)
| Boston Garden15,320
| 32–25
|- align="center" bgcolor="#ccffcc"
| 58
| February 7, 1981
| Cleveland
| W 99–96
|
|
|
| Market Square Arena
| 33–25
|- align="center" bgcolor="#ccffcc"
| 59
| February 8, 1981
| @ Detroit
| W 124–101
|
|
|
| Pontiac Silverdome
| 34–25
|- align="center" bgcolor="#ffcccc"
| 60
| February 11, 19817:35p.m. EST
| Milwaukee
| L 101–107
| Orr (21)
| Orr (11)
| Davis (7)
| Market Square Arena11,817
| 34–26
|- align="center" bgcolor="#ffcccc"
| 61
| February 13, 1981
| @ New Jersey
| L 100–103
|
|
|
| Rutgers Athletic Center
| 34–27
|- align="center" bgcolor="#ccffcc"
| 62
| February 15, 19814:05p.m. EST
| Chicago
| W 113–107
| McGinnis (27)
| Bantom (11)
| Davis (6)
| Market Square Arena10,513
| 35–27
|- align="center" bgcolor="#ffcccc"
| 63
| February 18, 1981
| Atlanta
| L 96–99
|
|
|
| Market Square Arena
| 35–28
|- align="center" bgcolor="#ccffcc"
| 64
| February 20, 19817:35p.m. EST
| San Antonio
| W 109–106
| McGinnis (24)
| McGinnis (12)
| Davis (8)
| Market Square Arena10,419
| 36–28
|- align="center" bgcolor="#ffcccc"
| 65
| February 22, 1981
| Portland
| L 109–113 (OT)
|
|
|
| Market Square Arena
| 36–29
|- align="center" bgcolor="#ffcccc"
| 66
| February 25, 19819:00p.m. EST
| @ Houston
| L 100–101
| Edwards (25)
| Edwards (11)
| Davis (12)
| The Summit13,121
| 36–30
|- align="center" bgcolor="#ccffcc"
| 67
| February 27, 1981
| @ Dallas
| W 118–111
|
|
|
| Reunion Arena
| 37–30

|- align="center" bgcolor="#ffcccc"
| 68
| March 3, 1981
| @ Portland
| L 112–117
|
|
|
| Memorial Coliseum
| 37–31
|- align="center" bgcolor="#ffcccc"
| 69
| March 4, 1981
| @ Seattle
| L 93–105
|
|
|
| Kingdome
| 37–32
|- align="center" bgcolor="#ccffcc"
| 70
| March 6, 19817:35p.m. EST
| Boston
| W 110–104
| Knight (32)
| Bantom (6)
| Davis (6)
| Market Square Arena17,032
| 38–32
|- align="center" bgcolor="#ccffcc"
| 71
| March 8, 1981
| Denver
| W 129–119
|
|
|
| Market Square Arena
| 39–32
|- align="center" bgcolor="#ffcccc"
| 72
| March 10, 19817:35p.m. EST
| Philadelphia
| L 102–103
| Knight (22)
| Edwards,Knight (8)
| Davis (11)
| Market Square Arena17,032
| 39–33
|- align="center" bgcolor="#ccffcc"
| 73
| March 12, 1981
| @ Washington
| W 114–107
|
|
|
| Capital Centre
| 40–33
|- align="center" bgcolor="#ccffcc"
| 74
| March 13, 19817:30p.m. EST
| @ Boston
| W 101–94
| Davis (24)
| C. Johnson (17)
| Davis (9)
| Hartford Civic Center15,622
| 41–33
|- align="center" bgcolor="#ffcccc"
| 75
| March 14, 1981
| Detroit
| L 94–101
|
|
|
| Market Square Arena
| 41–34
|- align="center" bgcolor="#ffcccc"
| 76
| March 17, 1981
| @ New York
| L 89–114
|
|
|
| Madison Square Garden
| 41–35
|- align="center" bgcolor="#ffcccc"
| 77
| March 18, 19818:05p.m. EST
| @ Philadelphia
| L 95–107
| McGinnis (22)
| Edwards,McGinnis (9)
| Knight (4)
| The Spectrum12,756
| 41–36
|- align="center" bgcolor="#ffcccc"
| 78
| March 20, 1981
| New York
| L 107–110
|
|
|
| Market Square Arena
| 41–37
|- align="center" bgcolor="#ccffcc"
| 79
| March 22, 1981
| Cleveland
| W 107–101
|
|
|
| Market Square Arena
| 42–37
|- align="center" bgcolor="#ccffcc"
| 80
| March 26, 1981
| @ Atlanta
| W 115–107
|
|
|
| The Omni
| 43–37
|- align="center" bgcolor="#ccffcc"
| 81
| March 27, 1981
| Washington
| W 122–107
|
|
|
| Market Square Arena
| 44–37
|- align="center" bgcolor="#ffcccc"
| 82
| March 29, 19811:05p.m. EST
| Chicago
| L 97–101
| Knight (25)
| Edwards (9)
| Davis (12)
| Market Square Arena16,663
| 44–38

Playoffs

|- align="center" bgcolor="#ffcccc"
| 1
| March 31, 19818:05p.m. EST
| @ Philadelphia
| L 108–124
| Knight (25)
| C. Johnson,Knight (7)
| Davis (8)
| The Spectrum7,288
| 0–1
|- align="center" bgcolor="#ffcccc"
| 2
| April 2, 19818:05p.m. EST
| Philadelphia
| L 85–96
| Davis (21)
| C. Johnson (13)
| Knight (4)
| Market Square Arena8,921
| 0–2
|-

Player statistics

Season

Playoffs

Player Statistics Citation:

Player totals

Season

Playoffs

Awards and records
 Jack McKinney, NBA Coach of the Year Award
 Dudley Bradley, NBA All-Defensive Second Team

Transactions

Free Agents

References

Indiana Pacers seasons
In
Indiana
Indiana